John James Wright (20 February 1821 – 22 October 1904) was an Australian flour miller, local government councillor, local government head, member of the Parliament of New South Wales, orangeman and store/shopkeeper.

Early life
Wright was born in Ballina in County Mayo, Ireland, the son of John Wright.

Legislative Assembly
Wright contested the Legislative Assembly seat of Queanbeyan at the 1874–75 election, winning with 455 votes (53.3%). He did not stand for re-election in 1877, and was unsuccessful in attempts to regain the seat in 1882, and 1885. He did not hold ministerial office.

References

 

Members of the New South Wales Legislative Assembly
Australian Anglicans
Australian people of Irish descent
Australian flour millers and merchants
1821 births
1904 deaths
19th-century Australian politicians
19th-century Australian businesspeople